The Chapel of Our Lady of the Rosary, popularly known as Capilla Maturana, is a Roman Catholic church building in the neighbourhood of Bella Vista, Montevideo, Uruguay.

The first church was consecrated in 1923, although the current temple was built two decades later. It is dedicated to Our Lady of the Rosary and held by the Salesians of Don Bosco, who also run the adjacent private school "San Francisco de Sales". Both the church and the school are known as "Maturana", since this is the name of a nearby street where they were originally located in 1907.

Same devotion
There are other churches in Uruguay dedicated to Our Lady of the Rosary:
 Parish Church of Our Lady of the Rosary and St. Dominic in Cordón 
 Parish Church of Our Lady of the Rosary in La Barra
 Our Lady of the Rosary Parish Church in Rosario
 Basilica of Our Lady of the Rosary and St. Benedict of Palermo in Paysandú
 Our Lady of the Rosary Parish Church in Villa Rodríguez
And some temples dedicated to the Virgin of the Rosary of Pompei:
 Parish Church of Our Lady of the Rosary of Pompei in Piedras Blancas
 Our Lady of the Rosary of Pompei Parish Church in San José de Mayo

References

Roman Catholic churches completed in 1943
Roman Catholic church buildings in Montevideo
Salesian churches in Uruguay
20th-century Roman Catholic church buildings in Uruguay